The Brit Asia TV Music Awards, also known as Brit Asia TV World Music Awards or the abbreviation BAMA, is an awards show that is held annually in the United Kingdom since 2010 (except in 2016), usually in October. The awards show is produced by Brit Asia TV. Awards winners are decided by public voting at a website, from a list of nominees presented by the event organizers at a nomination party. Website desiblitz called it "UK's largest celebration of South Asian music" and "the biggest awards in the British Asian Music calendar".

History 
The inaugural edition of the BAMA was in 2010, two years after the establishment of the Brit Asia TV channel in April 2008. The event was held in Birmingham, the so-called "Bhangra capital of the world". Birmingham also held most of the following editions except the 2011 and 2018 editions, held in London, and the 2019 edition held in Wembley. The editions between 2012 and 2017 were all held at same venue, the Utilita Arena Birmingham (under different names).

The first event was hosted by comedian Hardeep Singh Kohli, as were the 2011 and 2012 editions. Other hosts which appeared more than once include Sunny and Shay, co-hosting in 2014 and 2015, and Sukhi Bart which hosted the 2014, 2015 and 2017 events.

The 2016 event, originally planned to be held on 5 November 2016 was cancelled due to Brit Asia TV re-branding and restructuring, and rescheduled to 4 March 2017, thus making it the 2017 event, cancelling the 2016 one.

The 2019 event was the first event to have a title sponsor, with the title "BritAsia TV Presents Kuflink Music Awards 2019". , the latest edition of the BAMA was the 2019 event, and no nominees were published, nor any other announcement was made, regarding the 2020 event. Another event organized by BritAsia TV, the BritAsia TV Punjabi Film Awards 2020, was postponed due to COVID-19 pandemic concerns.

Award winners

2010
The inaugural 2010 event was held at Symphony Hall, Birmingham on 2 May 2010. It was hosted by Hardeep Singh Kohli. The nominees announcement party was held at the Ricoh Arena in Coventry. Award winners were:
 Best Album: Unforgettable by Imran Khan
 Best Single: "Down" by Jay Sean
 Best Male Act: Jaz Dhami
 Best Female Act: Miss Pooja
 Best Band: DCS
 Best Urban Act: Jay Sean
 Best DJ: DJ H
 Best Newcomer: JK
 Best Producer: Sukshinder Shinda
 Best Urban Asian: Mumzy Stranger
 Best International Artist: Babbu Mann
 Best Alternative Act: Shiva Sound System
 Best Video: "Ghum Sum" by Sukshinder Shinda
 Outstanding Achievement: Malkit Singh
 Lifetime Achievement: Avtar Singh Kang

2011
The 2011 event was at the HMV Hammersmith Apollo, London, on 1 October 2011. It was hosted by Hardeep Singh Kohli. The nominations party was held on 25 August 2011 in Birmingham Award winners were:
Best Newcomer: Garry Sandhu
Best International Act: Satinder Sartaaj
Best Non-Asian Music Produce: rKray Twinz
Best Video: "Pumbeeri" by Foji
Best Male Act: Garry Sandhu
Best Female Act: Preeya Kalidas
Best Band: Jazzy B and Band 
Best Urban Asian Act: The Truth
Best Single: "Moorni" by Panjabi MC
Best Album: Gabru Panjab Dha by JK
Best Asian Music Producer: Panjabi MC 
Best Club DJ: DJ Kayper
Best Alternative Act: Nasha Experience
Best Song Writer: Jandu Littranwala
Lifetime Achievement Award: Bhujhangy Group

2012
The 2012 event was held at the National Indoor Arena, Birmingham on 6 October 2012. It was hosted by Hardeep Singh Kohli. The nominations party was held on 23 August 2012 at the Jewellery Quarter, Birmingham. Award winners were:
 Best Newcomer: Jay Status
 Best International Act: Honey Singh
 Best Non Asian Music Producer: Naughty Boy
 Best Music Video: "Hukam" by Jazzy B
 Best Male Act: Jazzy B
 Best Female Act: Kanika Kapoor
 Best Band: The Entourage live band
 Best Urban Asian Act: Roach Killa
 Best Single: "Jugni Ji" by Dr Zeus & Kanika Kapoor
 Best Album: Judaa by Amrinder Gill
 Best Asian Music Producer: Dr Zeus
 Best Club DJ: Jags Klimax
 Best Dressed Act: Sukshinder Shinda
 Best Songwriter: Amrit Saab

2013 
The 2013 event was held on 12 October 2013 at the National Indoor Arena, Birmingham. It was hosted by Kulvinder Ghir. The nominations party was held on 4 September 2013 at the Edgbaston Cricket Ground in Birmingham. Award winners were:
Best Newcomer: San2
Best International Act: Diljit Dosanjh
Best Live Band: The Legends Band
Best Club DJ: Sonny Ji
Best Female Act: Sarika Gill
Best Male Act: Jaz Dhami
Best Non-Asian Music Producer: Naughty Boy
Best Urban Asian Act: Roach Killa
Best Songwriter: Kashmir Thakarwal
Best Music Video: "We Doin’ It Big" by RDB
Best Urban Asian Single: "Satisfya" by Imran Khan
Best Bhangra Single: "Kharku" by Diljit Dosanjh
Best Album: Back 2 Basics by Diljit Dosanjh
Best Asian Music Producer: Tru Skool
Lifetime Achievement: Surinder Shinda

2014 
The 2014 event was held on 4 October 2014 at the National Indoor Arena, Birmingham. It was hosted by Sunny and Shay and by Sukhi Bart. The nominations party was held at the Edgbaston Cricket Ground on August 28, 2014. Award winners were:
 Best Newcomer: Bloodline
 Best International Act: Diljit Dosanjh
 Best Non-Asian Music Producer: Mumzy Stranger
 Best Music Video: "Daddy Da Cash" by RDB feat. T-Pain
 Best Male Act: Jazzy B
 Best Female Act: Kanika Kapoor
 Best Band: The Legends Band
 Best Urban Asian Act: Raxstar
 Best Single: "Zulfa" by Jaz Dhami
 Best Album: 12B by B21
 Best Asian Music Producer: Partners in Rhyme
 Best Club DJ: AJD
 Best Urban Single: "Swag Mera Desi" by Manj Musik and Raftaar
 Best Songwriter: Satinder Sartaaj
 Lifetime Achievement Award: Apache Indian

2015 
The 2015 event was held on 3 October 2015 at Barclaycard Arena, Birmingham. It was hosted by Sunny and Shay and by Sukhi Bart. The nominations announcement party was held at Villa Park, Birmingham, on 5 September 2015. Award winners were:
 Breakthrough Act: Zack Knight
 Best Songwriter: Abbi Fatehgarhia
 Best Dance Group: Gabru Punjab De
 Best Deejay: DJ Dips
 Best North American Act: Mickey Singh
 Best Live Band: The Legends Band
 Bollywood Record of the Year: "Lovely" by Dr Zeus and Kanika Kapoor
 Best Urban Asian Act: Imran Khan
 Best Bollywood Act: Kanika Kapoor
 Best UK Album: Chapter V by DJ Vix
 Best World Album: Mitti Di Bawa by Ranjit Bawa
 Best Female Act: Kanika Kapoor
 Best Male Act: Diljit Dosanjh
 Best Producer: Dr Zeus
 Best Music Video: "Imaginary" by Imran Khan
 Best UK Single: "Imaginary" by Imran Khan
 Best World Single: "Patiala Peg" by Diljit Dosanjh
 Lifetime Achievement Award: Gurcharan Mall

2017 
The 2017 event was held on 4 March 2017 at Utilita Arena Birmingham. It was hosted by Sukhi Bart and Mandy Takhar. The nominations party was held at the Park Regis Hotel in Birmingham on 10 February 2017. Award winners were:
 Best Breakthrough Act: Akhil
 Best Bollywood Act: Badshah
 Best Music Producer: Tru Skool
 Best Music Video: "Do you know" by Diljit Dosanjh
 Best Male Act: Diljit Dosanjh
 Best Female Act: Sunanda Sharma
 Best Band: The Legends Live Band
 Best Urban Asian Act: Zack Knight
 Best Single: "Gani" by Manni Sandhu
 Best Album: One Time 4 Ya Mind by Tru Skool
 Best Club DJ: Kray Twins
 Best Dance Group: Nachda Sansar
 Bollywood Record of the year: Kala Chashma
 Best Songwriter: Satinder Sartaaj
 Lifetime Achievement Award: Channi Singh

2018 
The 2018 event was held on 6 October 2018 at Park Plaza Westminster Bridge in London. It was hosted by Preeya Kalidas and Apache Indian. Award winners were:
 Best DJ: DJ Frenzy
 Breakthrough Act: G. Sidhu
 Best Lyricist: Sidhu Moose Wala for "So High"
 Best Music Video Director: Sunny Dhinsey for "Udaarian"
 Bollywood Track of the Year: "Dilbar" by Neha Kakkar
 Best Male Act: Guru Randhawa
 Best Non-Traditional Asian Act: Steel Banglez
 Best Female Act: Jasmine Sandlas
 Music Producer of the Year: Vee
 UK Act of the Year: JK
 Album of the Year: CON.FI.DEN.TIAL by Diljit Dosanjh
 Music Video of the Year: "Udaarian" by Satinder Sartaaj
 Track of the Year: "Lahore" by Guru Randhawa
 Special Recognition: Raghav
 Outstanding Achievement: Panjabi MC
 Lifetime Achievement Award: Arif Lohar

2019 
The 2019 event, originally planned for 28 September 2019, was held on 30 November 2019 at SSE Arena, Wembley. It was hosted by Jassa Ahluwali and Kiran Rai. The event was sponsored by Kuflink. Award winners were:
 Track of the Year: "Legend" by Sidhu Moosewala
Best Album: PBX 1 by Sidhu Moose Wala
 Best UK Male Act: Gurj Sidhu
 Best UK Female Act: Rika
 Best International Male Act: Sidhu Moose Wala
 Best International Female Act: Jasmine Sandlas
 Best Breakthrough Act: F1rstman
 Lifetime Achievement Award: Balwinder Safri
 Best Collaboration: "Dance" by F1rstman, Juggy D, H Dhami, Mumzy and Raxstar
 Best Music Video: "Yaar Chadeya" by Sharry Mann
 Best Music Video Director: Navjit Buttar
 Best Music Producer: Manni Sandhu
 Best Lyricist: Sidhu Moosewala
 Best Non-Traditional Asian Act: Steel Banglez
 Best DJ: AJD

References

External links
 

British music awards
2010 establishments in the United Kingdom
Awards established in 2010
Asian music awards